= Akathiyoor =

- Census Town
- Location in Kerala, India
- Coordinates: 10.40°N 76.5°E
- Country: India
- State: Kerala
- District: Thrissur

Population (2001)
  - Total: 5,274

Languages
  - Official: Malayalam, English
- Time zone: UTC+5:30 (IST)
- PIN: 680 503
- Telephone code: 04885

Akathiyoor is a census town in Thrissur district in the state of Kerala, India.

== Demographics ==
At the 2001 India census, Akathiyoor had a population of 5,274 (47% male, 53% female). Akathiyoor had an average literacy rate of 84%, higher than the national average of 59.5%, with 48% of males and 52% of females literate. 10% of the population was under 6 years of age.
